William Joshua Hopkins (born September 12, 1970) is an American actor. Some of his best known roles include Raymond Millbury on Ally McBeal (2001–2002), Grayson Ellis on Cougar Town (2009–2015), and Liam O'Connor on Quantico (2015–2016).

Early life
He was born to Larry J. Hopkins and Carolyn Pennebaker on September 12, 1970. He has two sisters.

Career
Hopkins joined the fourth and last season, of New York Undercover in 1998. In 1999 Hopkins appeared in Alanis Morissette's "Unsent" music video. Hopkins portrayed Paul Allen in the 1999 film Pirates of Silicon Valley and Raymond Milbury on the television series Ally McBeal (2001 to 2002). He portrayed womanizer Charlie Babcock on the television series Pepper Dennis (2006). He later worked with his former Ally McBeal co-star Calista Flockhart when he had a recurring role on Brothers & Sisters. He also had a semi regular role as Peter Manning on the Fox drama Vanished (2006).

In 2005, Hopkins guest starred on Fox's show Bones as Temperance Brennan's former professor and lover, Michael Stires, in the episode "The Girl in the Fridge". Hopkins has also guest starred in CSI: Miami. In season 1 of the CBS series Cold Case, Hopkins played the role of Assistant District Attorney Jason Kite. The show was especially noted for the on-screen chemistry between Hopkins' character and the character of Detective Lilly Rush, played by Kathryn Morris.

Hopkins is the writer and performer of the song "Feigning Interest", a humorous music video about dating that became popular in 2007.

Hopkins starred in the 2008 CBS summer drama Swingtown as Roger Thompson. The series was intended for the fall 2007 season, but was postponed due to the writer's strike. It has sparked some controversy for its portrayal of 1970s culture, including open marriage and key parties.

In 2009, Hopkins appeared as Dr. Noah Barnes in season 2 of ABC's Private Practice. He played the character Grayson Ellis on the sitcom Cougar Town, which premiered September 23, 2009, on ABC and later moved to TBS. In 2015, Hopkins joined the main cast for Quantico playing the role of Liam O'Connor, a seasoned FBI agent working in the academy.

In 2018, Hopkins joined the main cast of Whiskey Cavalier in the role of FBI agent Ray Prince.

Hopkins currently works on a podcast called The Rex Chapman Show, which debuted on Basketballnews.com on March 16, 2021 with friend and former NBA player Rex Chapman.

Filmography

Film

Television

References

External links 
 
 Josh Hopkins cast bio on The WB
 Hopkins in "12 men of Christmas" premieres on Lifetime on December 5, 2009

1970 births
American male film actors
American male television actors
Male actors from Kentucky
Living people
Actors from Lexington, Kentucky
Sayre School alumni
Auburn University alumni
20th-century American male actors
21st-century American male actors